Reina Beltman (born 9 June 1996) is a Dutch female artistic gymnast, representing her nation at international competitions. She was an alternate alongside Tisha Volleman for the 2016 Summer Olympics.

References

1996 births
Living people
Dutch female artistic gymnasts
People from Hoorn
Sportspeople from North Holland
20th-century Dutch women
20th-century Dutch people
21st-century Dutch women